Chloridea subflexa is a moth of the family Noctuidae first described by Achille Guenée in 1852. It is found from most of the United States, throughout the Antilles, and south to Argentina.

The larvae feed exclusively on fruits of Physalis species, which are enclosed in an inflated, lantern-shaped calyx. To feed, each newly emerged caterpillar cuts a small hole in the calyx and then bores into the fruit. Once inside, the caterpillar spends the majority of its time sheltered inside of the fruit's husk.

Chloridea subflexa was formerly a member of the genus Heliothis, but was moved to the reinstated genus Chloridea as a result of genetic and morphological research published in 2013.

The MONA or Hodges number for Chloridea subflexa is 11070.

References

External links

 Determinants of host use and fitness of Heliothis subflexa, a specialized herbivore
 Moths of Belize
 
 Large moths of Guana Island, British Virgin Islands: a survey of efficient colonizers (Lepidoptera: Sphingidae, Notodontidae, Noctuidae, Arctiidae, Geometridae, Hyblaeidae, Cossidae)

Heliothinae